The 1911-12 English football season was the 24th season in the Football League for Aston Villa.

"Happy" Harry Hampton was a prolific goalscorer and scored five goals when Aston Villa beat Sheffield Wednesday 10–0 in a First Division match in 1912.  Hampton was joint top goalscorer in the First Division this season. "The Wellington Whirlwind," played as a centre forward for Aston Villa from 1904 to 1920.

In March, Justice A.T. Lawrence established the legality of the football league's retain-and-transfer system with his judgement in the Kingaby case. Former Aston Villa player Herbert Kingaby had brought legal proceedings against his old club for preventing him from playing.  Erroneous strategy by Kingaby's counsel resulted in the suit being dismissed.

Final League table

Results

References

External links
AVFC History: 1911-12 season

Aston Villa F.C. seasons
Aston Villa F.C.